UAP Old Mutual Group is a financial services  conglomerate that maintains its headquarters in Kenya, with subsidiaries in Uganda, Tanzania, South Sudan, Rwanda and the Democratic Republic of the Congo.

Location
The coordinates of the company headquarters are: 01°17'56.0"S, 36°49'10.0"E (Latitude:-1.298889; Longitude:36.819444).

Overview
In 2014 Old Mutual acquired a controlling 67 percent interest in Faulu Kenya, the second-largest microfinance bank in Kenya, whose stock is privately held, for a sum of KSh3.6 billion (approx. US$40 million). In early 2015, Old Mutual, spent a total of US$253.1 million (KSh 23.1 billion) to acquire 60.66 percent shareholding in UAP Holdings. Later in 2015, Old Mutual began to consolidate all its investments in Kenya under one company, namely the "UAP Old Mutual Group". The integration involves (a) UAP Holdings, in which Old Mutual owns 60.66 percent (b) Faulu Kenya, in which Old Mutual owns 67 percent and (c) the legacy businesses of Old Mutual Kenya, in which Old Mutual maintains 100 percent shareholding. UAP Old Mutual plans to list its shares on the Nairobi Securities Exchange (NSE) in 2018, after the mergers are concluded.

Governance
The group is governed by a 14-person board of directors chaired by Dr. Joseph Barrage Wanjui, a shareholder in the business. The Group CEO is Peter Mwangi, a certified public accountant and a chartered financial analyst.

See also
 UAP Holdings
 Faulu Kenya
 Old Mutual

References

External links
 
Website of UAP Old Mutual Group

Financial services companies of Kenya
Companies based in Nairobi
Conglomerate companies of Kenya
Financial services companies established in 2015
2015 establishments in Kenya